"Miss You in a Heartbeat" is a 1994 song by British hard rock band Def Leppard. The song was released as a single from their album Retro Active.

Background
Three versions of the song appear on Retro Active; the acoustic version (4:04), which was released as the single, the electric version (4:56), which was one of the bonus tracks for the Japanese pressing of Adrenalize along with "She's Too Tough", before both were remixed for Retro Active, and the piano version which is featured as a hidden track on the Retro Active album. It is played after the electric version of "Two Steps Behind".

The single peaked at number 39 on the US Billboard Hot 100 and was Def Leppard's last American top 40 single to date.

Although "Miss You in a Heartbeat" was written by Def Leppard guitarist Phil Collen, it was initially recorded and released by The Law on their 1991 self-titled debut.

Track listing 
Cassette single Bludgeon Riffola / Polygram / Mercury / 858 080-4 (USA)

 "Miss You in a Heartbeat"
 "Let's Get Rocked (Live)"

CD single  Bludgeon Riffola/ Nippon Phonogram/ PHCR-8302 (JAP)

 "Miss You in a Heartbeat" (Band Acoustic Version)
 "Two Steps Behind" (Joe's Demo)
 "She's Too Tough" (Joe's Demo)
 "Miss You in a Heartbeat" (Acoustic Version)

Note: In Germany, the CD single was also double packed with the In the Clubs... In Your Face EP in 1994 as a maxi-single.

Charts

References

Def Leppard songs
1993 songs
Songs written by Phil Collen
Rock ballads
Mercury Records singles